The 2019 Black-Eyed Susan Stakes was the 95th running of the Black-Eyed Susan Stakes. The race took place on May 17, 2019, and was televised in the United States on the NBC Sports Network. Ridden by jockey Javier Castellano, Point of Honor won the race by a half length over runner-up Ulele. Approximate post time on the Friday evening before the Preakness Stakes was 4:40 p.m. Eastern Time. The Maryland Jockey Club supplied a purse of $250,000 for the 95th running. The race was run over a fast track in a final time of 1:51.87.  The Maryland Jockey Club reported a Black-Eyed Susan Stakes Day record attendance of 51,573. The attendance at Pimlico Race Course that day was a record crowd for Black-Eyed Susan Stakes Day and the fifth largest for a thoroughbred race in North America in 2019.

Payout 

The 95th Black-Eyed Susan Stakes Payout Schedule

$2 Exacta:  (8–3) paid   $ 71.20

$1 Trifecta:  (8–3–4) paid   $ 210.30

$1 Superfecta:  (8–3–4-78) paid   $ 678.20

The full chart 

 Winning Breeder: Sienna Farms, LLC; (KY)  
 Final Time: 1:47.88
 Track Condition: Fast
 Total Attendance: Record of 51,573

See also 
 2019 Preakness Stakes
 Black-Eyed Susan Stakes Stakes "top three finishers" and # of  starters

References

External links 
 Official Black-Eyed Susan Stakes website
 Official Preakness website

2019 in horse racing
Horse races in Maryland
2019 in American sports
Black-Eyed Susan Stakes
2019 in sports in Maryland
May 2019 sports events in the United States